Gentile is an Italian surname and given name.

Persons with the surname
 Alessandro Gentile (born 1992), Italian basketball player
 Carlo Gentile, (1835–1893), Italian-American photographer
 Caroline D. Gentile (1924–2008), American academic and physical education instructor at University of Maine at Presque Isle
 Claudio Gentile (born 1953), Italian retired football defender
 Diodato Gentile (1555–1616), Italian Roman Catholic prelate
 Dominic Salvatore Gentile (1920–1951), American Air Force officer
 Donato Gentile (born 1957), Italian politician
 Doris Gentile (1894–1972), Australian novelist and short story writer
 Edera Gentile (1920–1993), Italian discus throw
 Emilio Gentile (born 1946), Italian historian
 Enrico Gentile (born 1921), Italian singer of the 1940s
 Fedele Gentile (1908–1993), Italian film actor
 Ferdinando Gentile (born 1967), retired Italian basketball player
 Gary Gentile (born 1946), American author and pioneering technical diver
 Gian Gentile, US Army officer
 Giovanni Gentile (1875–1944), Italian fascist philosopher
 Giovanni Gentile (composer)
 Giulio Vincenzo Gentile (1620–1694), Italian Roman Catholic prelate 
 Giuseppe Gentile (born 1934), retired Italian triple jumper
 Guy Gentile (born 1976), American trader
 Jim Gentile (born 1934), American baseball player
 Kay Johnson-Gentile, American musician and educator
 Linda Gentile (born 1951), American politician
 Mario Gentile, Canadian politician
 Melissa "Skeeter" Gentile, American softball coach
 Paul Gentile (born 1943), American lawyer and politician
 Sam Gentile (1916–1998), American baseball player
 Troy Gentile (born 1993), American actor
 Vincent J. Gentile, American politician

Persons with the given name
Gentile Bellini
Gentile da Fabriano
Gentile Portino da Montefiore
Gentile Virginio Orsini

See also
Gentili

Given names
Italian-language surnames